Laich is a surname. Notable people with the surname include:

Angela Laich (born 1963), German sculptor, draughtsperson, and painter
Brooks Laich (born 1983), Canadian ice hockey player
Katherine Laich (1910–1992), American librarian
Max Laich (fl. 1908–1910), Swiss footballer